Gaillard is a commune in the Haute-Savoie department in the Auvergne-Rhône-Alpes region in south-eastern France.

Gaillard lies on the border with Switzerland, 5 km east of the city centre of Geneva. The biggest border crossing is called Moillesulaz and the second one is Fossard.

Population

See also
Communes of the Haute-Savoie department

References

External links

official site for the town of Gaillard

Communes of Haute-Savoie